Francisco "Fran" Grima Aguilera (born 5 February 1987) is a Spanish professional footballer who plays as a right back for UD Ibiza.

Club career
Grima was born in Olesa de Montserrat, Barcelona, Catalonia, and made his senior debut with Terrassa FC's reserves in 2006, in the regional leagues. In 2007, he moved to Tercera División side UE Sant Andreu, and achieved promotion to Segunda División B at the end of the season.

In July 2008, Grima signed for CD Atlético Baleares in the third division, but returned to Sant Andreu roughly one year later. On 30 June 2010, he joined RCD Espanyol and was assigned to the reserves in the fourth level.

On 2 August 2011, Grima returned to Sant Andreu for a third spell. He then rejoined his first team Terrassa, now assigned to the main squad in the fourth division, before signing for CF Badalona in division three on 29 July 2013.

After being an undisputed starter for the Escapulats, Grima agreed to a contract with RCD Mallorca, recently relegated to the third tier, on 27 June 2017. The following 30 January, after featuring rarely, he moved to fellow league team UCAM Murcia CF on loan until June.

Grima left Mallorca on 3 July 2018, after the club's promotion, and signed for UD Ibiza on 18 July. He was a first-choice for the latter during the following years, helping in their first-ever promotion to Segunda División in 2021.

Grima made his professional debut at the age of already 34 on 13 August 2021, starting in a 0–0 away draw against Real Zaragoza.

References

External links
 
 

1987 births
Living people
People from Baix Llobregat
Sportspeople from the Province of Barcelona
Spanish footballers
Footballers from Catalonia
Association football defenders
Segunda División players
Segunda División B players
Tercera División players
Divisiones Regionales de Fútbol players
UE Sant Andreu footballers
CD Atlético Baleares footballers
RCD Espanyol B footballers
Terrassa FC footballers
CF Badalona players
RCD Mallorca players
UCAM Murcia CF players
UD Ibiza players